The Western Australian Club is a defunct social club founded in  in Perth, Western Australia.

History
The Western Australian Club began in 1893 as a gentlemen's club in the shape of a limited company with capital of, "five hundred pounds divided into 500 shares of £1 each." The original Memorandum of Association described the purpose as:

By 1894 there were 310 members, drawn from the rich and powerful of Western Australia. The gentlemen's club ethos was well established: 

In the 1950s membership continued to include many names from business, development, politics and the history of Western Australia. The financial fortunes of the club also tended to rise and fall with the fortunes of the state.

By the 1960s the state itself was changing. There was rapid economic growth in non-traditional areas. This growth brought new people to the state. The club, perhaps because it included accommodation for members, kept its existing members but had difficulty attracting new members: 

The economic growth of the state also brought increased competition for club services. In order to survive and grow, the club made changes to its role, its rules and its services. In the mid 1970s, 
 
There was a financial crisis, yet the club survived.

By the 1980s the Western Australian Club was no longer strictly a "gentlemen's club". Women were full members. Pastoralist and country members were less than one fifth of membership. Despite the changes, many traditional aspects of the club were maintained. In 1988 the club president wrote, 

Membership 
Original members of the club included John Forrest and his brother Alexander. Other significant business and political leaders belonging to the club included:
  Hardwick,
  Bunning,
 George Shenton,
 Newton Moore,
 Edward Wittenoom,
 Ross McLarty, and
 Charles Court as Honorary Life Member.

Publications
 Annual Report
 Newsletter
 Rules

See also
Karrakatta Club
Weld Club

Notes

References

External links

1893 establishments in Australia
2019 disestablishments in Australia
Clubs and societies in Western Australia
Organizations established in 1893
Organisations based in Perth, Western Australia
Gentlemen's clubs in Australia